B.J. Hollars (born 1984) is an American author of literary essays and nonfiction novels. He is the winner of the Blei/Derleth Nonfiction Award (2014) and the Society of Midland Authors Adult Nonfiction Award (2012). Hollars is the author of Dispatches from the Drownings: Reporting the Fiction of Nonfiction (University of New Mexico Press, 2014), Thirteen Loops: Race, Violence and the Last Lynching in America (University of Alabama Press, 2011) Opening the Doors: The Desegregation of the University of Alabama and the Fight for Civil Rights in Tuscaloosa (The University of Alabama Press, 2013) and other works.

Life and work

B.J. Hollars was born in Monticello, Indiana in 1984. He graduated as the senior class speaker at Knox College, where he delivered an address with former president Bill Clinton. He received his M.F.A. in creative writing from the University of Alabama in 2010. Hollars's essays have appeared in The Washington Post, Parents Magazine, The Rumpus, TriQuarterly, Brevity, The Millions, Wisconsin Life, Terrain, Huffington Post, North American Review, Quarterly West, and many other literary journals. He is an associate professor of English at the University of Wisconsin-Eau Claire.

Works

Books
Go West Young Man: A Father and Son Rediscover America on the Oregon Trail (forthcoming 2021)
Midwestern Strange: Hunting Monsters, Martians and the Weird in Flyover Country
The Road South: Personal Stories of the Freedom Riders
 Flock Together: A Love Affair with Extinct Birds
 From the Mouths of Dogs: What Our Pets Teach Us About Life, Death, and Being Human 
 This Is Only A Test 
 Dispatches from the Drownings: Reporting the Fiction of Nonfiction
 Opening the Doors: The Desegregation of the University of Alabama and the Fight for Civil Rights in Tuscaloosa
 Sightings: Stories 
Thirteen Loops: Race, Violence and the Last Lynching in America
 Blurring the Boundaries: Explorations to the Fringes of Nonfiction
 Monsters: A Collection of Literary Sightings
 You Must Be This Tall To Ride: Contemporary Writers Take You Inside the Story

Chapbooks 
Harbingers (Bull City Press, 2018)
 In Defense of Monsters (Bull City Press, 2017)

References

External links
 Website

1984 births
Living people
Writers from Indiana
People from Monticello, Indiana
Knox College (Illinois) alumni
University of Alabama alumni
Writers from Wisconsin